Peasants (흙 - Heulk) is a 1978 South Korean film directed by Kim Ki-young.

Plot
During the Japanese occupation, a Korean lawyer devotes his work to rural development, believing this is the only way to preserve Korean identity. Interpreting these actions as anti-Japanese, the Japanese authorities imprison the lawyer for five years. When he is released, he finds his wife continuing his work.

Cast
Lee Hwa-si
Kim Chung-chul
Yeom Bok-sun
Nam Sung-Hoon
Park Jung-ja
Kim Choo-ryeon
Gwon Mi-hye
Park Am
Kim Won-seop
Yeo Po

References

Bibliography

External links

Films directed by Kim Ki-young
1970s Korean-language films
South Korean historical drama films